The Sahara Conservation Fund (SCF) is an international non-governmental organization established in 2004 to conserve the wildlife, including the endangered species, of the Sahara desert and bordering Sahelian grasslands. Its goal is to maintain the Sahara as a well-conserved, well-managed desert in which ecological processes function naturally, with plants and animals in healthy numbers across their normal historical range. 

SCF creates partnerships between people, governments, worldwide zoos, and scientific communities, international conventions, NGOs, and donor agencies. Its activity is based on three complementary program areas: conserving the Sahara’s remaining wildlife, captive breeding and reintroduction of key species, and communicating the crisis faced by Saharan wildlife.  SCF currently works in several African countries, including Niger, Chad, Algeria, Senegal, and Tunisia. 

The Sahara Conservation Fund is incorporated as a 501(c)(3) not for profit organization in the state of Missouri and is hosted by the Wildcare Institute of the St. Louis Zoo.

References

External links
 Sahara Conservation Fund website

Sahara
Nature conservation organizations based in the United States
Charities based in Missouri
Saint Louis Zoo
Environmental organizations established in 1995
1995 establishments in Missouri
Wildlife conservation organizations